Austropyrgus halletensis is a species of minute freshwater snail with an operculum, an aquatic gastropod mollusc or micromollusc in the Hydrobiidae family. This species is endemic to South Australia, Australia. It is known from a small creek in the central Flinders Ranges.

See also 
 List of non-marine molluscs of Australia

References

Further reading

External links

Hydrobiidae
Austropyrgus
Endemic fauna of Australia
Gastropods of Australia
Gastropods described in 2003